Lousigam Ashok Singh (born 1 March 1989) is an Indian professional footballer.

Career

Sporting Goa
During the summer of 2011 Singh signed for newly promoted I-League side Sporting Clube de Goa.

Mohammedan
Singh made his Mohammedan debut in the I-League on 20 October 2013 against Rangdajied at the Nehru Stadium in Shillong; Kumar managed to keep the clean-sheet as Mohammedan won the match 0–3.

Career statistics

Club
Statistics accurate as of 27 October 2013

References

Indian footballers
1989 births
Living people
I-League players
Sporting Clube de Goa players
Rangdajied United F.C. players
Mohammedan SC (Kolkata) players
Footballers from Manipur
Association football goalkeepers